Baerietta japonica is a tapeworm of frogs in Japan.

References 

Cestoda
Parasites of amphibians
Taxa named by Satyu Yamaguti